The 2008 Capital One Bowl was held on January 1, 2008 at the Florida Citrus Bowl in Orlando, Florida. The game featured the University of Michigan Wolverines—who finished the 2007 season tied for second in the Big Ten Conference with an overall record of 8–4 (6–2 in the Big Ten)—and the #12 University of Florida Gators—who finished the 2007 season third in the Southeastern Conference's East Division with an overall record of 9–3 (5–3 in the SEC).

Pre-game buildup
This game was significant for several different reasons. It was the last game for the Michigan Wolverines' coach, Lloyd Carr, who had announced his retirement on November 19, 2007. During the game, Carr used a  passing spread offense to attack on the first drive against Florida's defense. The game was also the last game for the Michigan senior class, who had lost each of their previous three bowl games. It was also an opportunity for Heisman Trophy winner Tim Tebow and the Florida Gators to play in front of a crowd of mostly Gator fans, as Orlando and Gainesville are separated by less than a two-hour drive.

Coming into this game, Florida was highly favored to win. As Michigan had lost early in the season to Appalachian State and Oregon, teams who both employed a spread offense similar to Florida's, many predicted that Michigan would suffer a similar fate against Florida. However, the Wolverines were able to generate 524 yards of offense in defeating the Gators, turning the ball over four times, twice within one yard of scoring.

This game was a bit of a grudge match because Florida coach, Urban Meyer had lobbied for his team to get into the BCS National Championship game over Michigan during the 2006 season. Ultimately, Meyer's lobbying was successful and Florida went on to defeat Michigan's hated rivals Ohio State, 41–14, in the BCS National Championship Game. Previously, Michigan and Florida met four years earlier in the 2003 Outback Bowl, with Michigan defeating Florida, 38–30. Florida's loss makes them the second defending BCS Champion to lose a non-BCS bowl game a year later, the first being Florida's SEC rivals the LSU Tigers in the 2005 edition of this bowl game against the Iowa Hawkeyes.

Game summary

Michigan started the game at their own 6-yard line and put together a 94-yard opening drive. Michigan quarterback Chad Henne connected on a 21-yard pass to Mario Manningham to put Michigan up 7–0. Over the course of the game, Michigan turned the ball over four times (two fumbles and two interceptions), which resulted in two Florida touchdown drives. These two touchdowns eventually put the Gators ahead 35–31 with just under six minutes to play. The Wolverines regained the lead when Adrian Arrington caught a touchdown pass to make the score 38–35 in favor of Michigan. Florida got the ball back but could not convert on fourth down from their own 25-yard line. Michigan ran three straight plays that resulted in a K.C. Lopata field goal to make the score 41–35 with 2:20 remaining. On Florida's last possession, quarterback Tim Tebow failed to complete a pass on four consecutive downs. After knocking down Tebow's final pass, Michigan ran out the clock to clinch the win, 41–35.  Chad Henne was named the game's MVP.

Scoring summary

Game statistics

Individual statistics
* Completions/Attempts
a Carries
b Long play
c Receptions

* Completions/Attempts
a Carries
b Long play
c Receptions

References

External links
 ESPN game summary
 Summary at Bentley Historical Library, University of Michigan Athletics History

Capital One Bowl
Citrus Bowl (game)
Florida Gators football bowl games
Michigan Wolverines football bowl games
Capital One Bowl
Capital One Bowl